João Pedro Oliveira Santos (born 18 June 1993), commonly known as Pedrinho is a Brazilian footballer who plays as a forward for Pembroke Athleta in Malta.

Club career
Born in Barreiras, Bahia state, Pedrinho represented three clubs as a youth - Atlético Paranaense (2004–2009), São Paulo Futebol Clube (2009–2010), Flamengo (2010–2013). On 6 March 2013, he was loaned to Bahia de Feira for the season's Baiano campaign. On 17 December, he was loaned to América RN.

On 6 July 2017, Pedrinho signed with Georgian club FC Dila Gori after stints with Maltese club Tarxien Rainbows F.C. and Brazilian club América TO.

In 2019, Pedrinho returned to Malta and joined Pembroke Athleta.

References

External links

1993 births
Living people
Association football midfielders
Brazilian footballers
CR Flamengo footballers
Associação Desportiva Bahia de Feira players
América Futebol Clube (RN) players
Tarxien Rainbows F.C. players
FC Dila Gori players
Pembroke Athleta F.C. players
Maltese Premier League players
Erovnuli Liga players
Brazilian expatriate footballers